Gabriel Cossart (22 November 1615 – 18 September 1674) was a French Jesuit, known as a historian. He taught rhetoric at the College de Clermont. He was a librarian there, described as “worldly-wise”, and a promoter of the careers of his students. As a scholar he collaborated with Philippe Labbe.

He engaged in controversy over Petrus Ramus with François du Monstier.

Works
 Sacrosancta Concilia, with Philippe Labbe
 Orationes et Carmina

Notes

1615 births
1674 deaths
17th-century French Jesuits
17th-century French historians
French librarians
French male non-fiction writers